The Collection is compilation album by Greek composer Vangelis, released on 23 July 2012.

Overview
The 2xCD compilation was released in order to coincide with the 2012 Summer Olympics, where Vangelis's music from Chariots of Fire was used. The compilation includes 31 track from his scores, solo albums and collaborations. The new unreleased track "Remembering" is a mix of ethereal chimes with jovial saxophone.

Reception

The compilation has generally received positive reviews. Jonny Trunk of Record Collector noted that the track "Remembering" was previously unreleased, that the album includes some obvious classics, "mixed in with some of the lesser-known but equally worthy cues, such as the superb "Theme From Bitter Moon" ... Also great are the inclusion of instrumentals such as "Petite Fille de La Mer" and "To The Unknown Man", works from Vangelis' 70s back catalogue", and gave it 4/5 stars.

Mike Diver of BBC commented that the album is "welcomed as an entry point for absolute beginners", but "it might not be the most important of the choices contained herein", as there's much material from Blade Runner, the songs with Jon Anderson "have not dated amazingly well", and rather "more splendid-sounding in the 21st century is "La Petite Fille de la mer", written back in 1973".

Track listing

Charts

Certifications

Personnel
Dan Massie – Mastering
Vangelis Saitis – Engineer
Andy Tribe – Project Manager
Dmitris Tsakas – Saxophone
Vangelis – Arranger, composer, primary artist, producer
Stathis Zalidis – Photography

References

2012 albums
Vangelis albums